Brittany Ferries was a 60-foot waterline length trimaran that was sailed across the Atlantic Ocean in 1981.

See also
 List of multihulls

References

Trimarans
1980s sailing yachts